Admiral Sir Cyril Thomas Moulden Fuller,  (22 May 1874 – 1 February 1942) was a Royal Navy officer who served as Second Sea Lord and Chief of Naval Personnel from 1930 to 1932.

Early life
Fuller was born in the Isle of Wight on 22 May 1874, the son of Captain Thomas Fuller of the British Army. He joined the Britannia Royal Naval College as a cadet in 1887.

Naval career
He commanded the battlecruiser  from 1916 and then became Director of Naval Plans at the Admiralty in 1917. He was Head of the British Naval Section at the Peace Conference in Paris in 1919.

After the war, Fuller became Chief of Staff for the Atlantic Fleet in 1920 and Assistant Chief of the Naval Staff in 1922. He was made Third Sea Lord and Controller of the Navy in 1923 and given command of the Battlecruiser Squadron in 1925. He was appointed Commander-in-Chief of the America and West Indies Station in 1928 and Second Sea Lord and Chief of Naval Personnel in 1930. He retired in 1935.

During the Second World War, Fuller was Zone commander for the North Riding of Yorkshire Home Guard.

Family
In 1902 Fuller married Edith Margaret Connell.

References

|-

|-

|-

1874 births
1942 deaths
Royal Navy admirals
Knights Commander of the Order of the Bath
Companions of the Order of St Michael and St George
Companions of the Distinguished Service Order
Lords of the Admiralty
People educated at Stubbington House School
People from the Isle of Wight
British Home Guard officers
Military personnel from the Isle of Wight